”Understand” is a science fiction  novelette by American writer Ted Chiang, published in 1991.

Plot summary
The story follows a man who is given an experimental drug to heal brain damage caused by anoxia after he nearly drowns.  The drug regenerates his damaged neurons and has the unintended side effect of exponentially improving his intellect and motor skills.  As he gets smarter and smarter, he is pursued by several government agencies. Eventually he receives a message from another super-intelligent test subject and enters into conflict with him.

Awards
“Understand” was nominated for the 1992 Hugo Award for Best Novelette, and won the 1992 Asimov’s Reader Poll.

Recorded and film versions
The story has been recorded by Rhashan Stone and broadcast as a four-part series on BBC Radio 7. 

In 2014, Fox acquired a spec script by Eric Heisserer that is based on Ted Chiang's story.

See also
Superintelligence
Transhumanism
Flowers for Algernon

Footnotes

External links 
 
Understand audiobook in the Internet Archive

Science fiction short stories
1991 short stories
Hugo Award for Best Novelette winning works
Smart drugs in fiction
Works originally published in Asimov's Science Fiction
Short stories by Ted Chiang